Cordella may refer to:

Cordella, a Daughter of Albion in William Blake's mythology
HMS Cordella, a mine countermeasures vessel of the Royal Navy

People with the given name
Cordella Stevenson, American murder victim

People with the surname
Giacomo Cordella (1786–1847), Italian classical composer
Juan Cordella (died 1552), Italian Roman Catholic bishop